John Lacey is a former Ireland A and Ireland Sevens rugby union international and current rugby union referee. As a player, Lacey spent most of career with Shannon in the All-Ireland League. He also represented Munster. As an international referee he has taken charge of matches in the Six Nations Championship, the Rugby Championship and the Rugby World Cup. He also refereed the 2013 Pro12 Grand Final and the 2015–16 and 2016–17 European Rugby Challenge Cup finals.

Early years
Between 1986 and 1991 Lacey attended Abbey CBS in Tipperary where he studied for his Leaving Certificate. His classmates included Alan Quinlan. Between 1991 and 1993 he attended the Dublin Institute of Technology where he gained a diploma in hotel and catering management. Between 1993 and 1994 he gained a diploma in travel and tourism.

Playing career

Clubs
Lacey began his playing career with Clanwilliam before joining Sundays Well. In 1997 he switched to Shannon and was subsequently a prominent member of their team that won five All-Ireland League titles, four Munster Senior League titles  and eight Munster Senior Cups . Lacey was a prolific try scorer in the AIL, touching down on 57 occasions – including 10 for Sundays Well. In 2003 he became the first player to score 50 tries in the AIL. While playing at club level, Lacey also worked for Allied Irish Banks and as sales representative for the East Cork Oil Company before becoming a coach development officer for Munster Rugby in 1999.

Munster
In December 1995, aged 18, Lacey made his debut for Munster in a friendly against Transvaal. On 7 September 1997 Lacey scored a try as he made his Heineken Cup debut in a 1997–98 pool stage game against Harlequins. Lacey scored four tries in six Heineken Cup appearances for Munster. He also scored five tries in six Irish Interprovincial Rugby Championship appearances as he helped Munster win two titles.

Ireland international
At international level, Lacey played for both Ireland A and the Ireland Sevens.

Refereeing career

Early years
In April 2007, while still working as a coach development officer for Munster Rugby, Lacey agreed to take charge of a Munster Schools Junior Cup quarter-final between St Munchin's College and CBC after the original referee failed to show up. He subsequently began refereeing games in the All-Ireland League before making his Celtic League debut on 28 November 2008 when he took charge of a game between Edinburgh and the Ospreys.

European competitions
By 2009–10 Lacey was taking charge of matches in the European Challenge Cup. On 8 October 2010 Lacey made his debut as a Heineken Cup referee when he took charge of a 2010–11 pool stage game between Northampton Saints and Castres Olympique. This saw Lacey become the third referee, after Alain Rolland and Malcolm Changleng, to both play in and referee Heineken Cup matches.
Lacey has subsequently refereed the 2013 Pro12 Grand Final, and the 2015–16 and 2016–17 European Rugby Challenge Cup finals

International referee
Lacey gained his first experience as an international referee at the 2009 IRB Nations Cup. On 27 March 2010 he took charge of his first senior international, a European Nations Cup match between Romania and Spain. Lacey subsequently took charge of pool stage matches and semi-finals at both the 2010 and 2011 IRB Junior World Championships.
In 2012 Lacey began to referee top level international games. On 27 May 2012 he took charge of a match between England and the Barbarians at Twickenham Stadium. In June he took charge of two matches at the IRB Pacific Nations Cup. On 24 November 2012 Lacey took charge of a match between France and Samoa at the Stade de France.  
 On 1 February 2014 Lacey made his debut as a Six Nations Championship referee when he took charge of a match between Wales and Italy at the Millennium Stadium.
On 16 August 2014 Lacey made his debut as a Rugby Championship referee when he took charge of a match between South Africa and Argentina at the Loftus Versfeld Stadium. Lacey also served as a referee at the 2015 Rugby World Cup and took charge of the bronze final between South Africa and Argentina. In October 2017, together with Andrew Brace, George Clancy and Joy Neville, Lacey was one of seven referees offered professional contracts by the IRFU.

Honours
Shannon
All-Ireland League
Winners: 1997–98, 2001–02, 2003–04, 2004–05, 2005–06: 5
Munster Senior League
Winners: 2000–01, 2001–02, 2004–05, ?  : 4 
Munster Senior Cup
Winners: 1997–98, 1999–2000, 2000–01, 2001–02, 2002–03, 2003–04, 2004–05, 2005–06: 8 
Munster Rugby
Irish Interprovincial Rugby Championship
Winners: 1996–97, 1998–99: 2
Individual
Munster Rugby Referee of the Year
 2009, 2012: 2

Notes

References

Irish rugby union players
Irish rugby union referees
IRFU referees
Rugby World Cup referees
Six Nations Championship referees
The Rugby Championship referees
European Rugby Champions Cup referees
EPCR Challenge Cup referees
United Rugby Championship referees
Top 14 referees
Living people
1973 births
Rugby union players from County Tipperary
Munster Rugby players
Ireland international rugby sevens players
Ireland Wolfhounds international rugby union players
Shannon RFC players
Sundays Well RFC players
Alumni of Dublin Institute of Technology
1872 Cup referees